The Romania national under-16 football team represents Romania in international football at this age level and is controlled by Federația Română de Fotbal, the governing body for football in Romania.Majon Robert holds the record for the most goals in this age category.

Competitive record

UEFA European Under-16 and Under-17 Football Championship

Under-16 era

*Draws also include penalty shootouts, regardless of the outcome.

Under-17 era

*Draws also include penalty shootouts, regardless of the outcome.

Current squad

Results and fixtures

2020

See also
 Romania national football team
 Romania national under-21 football team
 Romania national under-20 football team
 Romania national under-17 football team
 European Under-16 Football Championship

References

External links
 Football Association of Romania

F
European national under-16 association football teams